The Nederlandse Spoorwegen (NS) Class 1500 were built by Metropolitan-Vickers in 1953–1955. They were originally built for British Railways (BR) as Class EM2 (later Class 77) for use on the Woodhead Route between Manchester and Sheffield. They were withdrawn by BR in 1969 and acquired by NS in 1969 following a locomotive shortage.

Description
Seven locomotives of this type were constructed. Construction took place at Gorton Works, Manchester with electrical equipment supplied by Metropolitan-Vickers. They had been withdrawn en masse in September 1968 by BR, and were stored at Bury in the hope of sale to a foreign railway. Around this time, NS had been suffering from a shortage of electric locomotives. In August 1969, Dutch officials inspected no. E27002, which then performed a test run between Sheffield and Reddish. NS were so impressed that they purchased all seven locomotives.

The class was shipped to the Netherlands in September 1969 by ferry from Harwich to Zeebrugge. They were then tripped to Tilburg workshops for assessment and repairs. One locomotive, no. E27005 Minerva was considered to be beyond economical repair and consequently broken up for spare parts. The remaining six locomotives entered the workshops for various modifications, including the fitting of Dutch headlight clusters, new pantographs and a new braking system. Driving controls were also relocated from the left side of the cab to the right. They were renumbered in the 1500 series in the order they left their workshops, starting with E27003 as 1501 in May 1970 and ending with E27002 as 1506 in June 1971.

The 1500s were primarily used on services in the southern part of the Netherlands. Typical passenger duty was Den Haag to Venlo. Freight duties were mainly operated at night and included Rotterdam Kijfhoek (freightyard) to Roosendaal.

By the early 1980s, new electric locomotives in the form of Class 1600 were being introduced. The 1500s were therefore made obsolete and withdrawals started in 1985. The final locomotives were withdrawn in 1986.

Fleet details

Modelling the NS 1500 Class 
 
Dutch manufacturer Philotrain offered a high quality certified small series brass model in the 1980s, which sold out fairly quickly. These models rarely appear for sale and consequently fetch premium prices. The model is in H0 scale.

Another Dutch manufacturer, KleiNSpoor, offered a resin and plastic based model, based on Athearn parts, as kits and ready-to-run versions, starting in the late 1990s. The model has been temporarily out of production as Athearn ceased delivery of parts, but it has now re-appeared in the KleiNSpoor catalogue as partially complete kit only. The model is in H0 scale.

External links 

 Description of the class
 Website of the EM2 Society
 Website of the Werkgroep Loc 1501

1500
1500 V DC locomotives
Co′Co′ locomotives
Co-Co locomotives
Metropolitan-Vickers locomotives
Electric locomotives of the Netherlands
Preserved electric locomotives
Standard gauge locomotives of the Netherlands
Railway locomotives introduced in 1953
Co′Co′ electric locomotives of Europe